David Maynard may refer to:

David Maynard, programmer with Electronic Arts
 David Swinson Maynard (1808–1873), American pioneer, doctor, and businessman